Scott Winters may refer to:

 Scott Winters (radio personality)
 Scott William Winters, American actor